South Dennis is a census-designated place (CDP) in the town of Dennis in Barnstable County, Massachusetts, United States. The population was 3,643 at the 2010 census, the most of the 5 CDPs in Dennis.

Geography
It is bordered by the town of Brewster to the northeast, the town of Harwich to the southeast, the CDPs of Dennis Port to the south and West Dennis to the southwest, the town of Yarmouth to the west, and the CDPs of Dennis and East Dennis to the north.

Demographics

As of the census of 2000, there were 3,679 people, 1,681 households, and 1,059 families residing in the CDP. The population density was 312.2/km (808.3/mi). There were 2,468 housing units at an average density of 209.4/km (542.3/mi). The racial makeup of the CDP was 95.41% White, 1.01% African American, 0.60% Native American, 0.35% Asian, 0.90% from other races, and 1.74% from two or more races. Hispanic or Latino of any race were 1.30% of the population.

There were 1,681 households, out of which 23.7% had children under the age of 18 living with them, 48.7% were married couples living together, 10.9% had a female householder with no husband present, and 37.0% were non-families. Of all households 31.4% were made up of individuals, and 16.0% had someone living alone who was 65 years of age or older. The average household size was 2.19 and the average family size was 2.74.

In the CDP, the population was spread out, with 20.3% under the age of 18, 4.2% from 18 to 24, 24.8% from 25 to 44, 26.1% from 45 to 64, and 24.6% who were 65 years of age or older. The median age was 46 years. For every 100 females, there were 83.4 males. For every 100 females age 18 and over, there were 78.8 males.

The median income for a household in the CDP was $40,330, and the median income for a family was $47,935. Males had a median income of $35,026 versus $26,818 for females. The per capita income for the CDP was $22,974. About 2.0% of families and 3.2% of the population were below the poverty line, including 0.7% of those under age 18 and 3.7% of those age 65 or over.

Education
N. H. Wixon Innovation School (grades 4–5) is a public school in South Dennis. The school was named after prominent Dennisport fisherman Nathaniel H. Wixon, a descendant of more than 15 of the original Mayflower Pilgrims.

References

External links

 South Dennis Free Public Library
 Nathaniel H. Wixon Innovation School

Census-designated places in Barnstable County, Massachusetts
Census-designated places in Massachusetts
Dennis, Massachusetts